The 22161 / 22162 Rajya Rani Express is a daily Intercity Express train service offered by West Central Railways.
It runs between Bhopal Junction railway station of Bhopal, the state capital city of Madhya Pradesh and Damoh in the same state.

Number and nomenclature
22161 – Bhopal to Damoh
22162 – Damoh to Bhopal

Route & Halts
The train goes via. Bina–Katni rail route.
It halts at;

 
 
 
 
 
 
 
 
 Ganeshganj

Traction
Both trains are hauled by a Itarsi-based WAP-5 locomotive from Bhopal Junction to Damoh and vice versa.

Coach composition
1 AC Chair Car
10 General Chair Car

See also
Damoh–Kota Passenger

References

Rajya Rani Express trains
Rail transport in Madhya Pradesh
Transport in Bhopal
Railway services introduced in 2011
Damoh